Emily Tissot (born 11 April 1993 at Strasbourg) is a French athlete, who specializes in race walking.

Biography

Prize list  
 French Championships in Athletics   :
 winner of 10 000 m walk 2014
 winner of the 20 km walk in 2013
 French Indoor Athletics Championships:
 winner of 3000 m walk 2013 and 2014

Records

Notes and references

External links  
 
  Profile Emily Tissot on the site of the FFA

1993 births
Living people
French female racewalkers